The Andrew Peterson Farmstead is a farm just east of Waconia, Minnesota, United States. The farm is located in rural Carver County, Minnesota on Minnesota State Highway 5.  The farm is listed on the National Register of Historic Places for its association with its first owner, Andrew Peterson. It is owned and operated by the Carver County Historical Society.

History

Andrew Peterson  (Anders Pettersson)  was born October 20, 1818 at Västra Ryd parish in Ydre härad, Östergötland, Sweden.  He died March 31, 1898 in Waconia, Carver County, Minnesota. He emigrated from Rydsnäs, Sweden to American in 1850.  With his sister and fourteen other emigrants, they arrived in Boston on July 2, 1850.  He arrived in Burlington, Iowa about four weeks later and lived there for four years.  He later moved to Minnesota in 1855, claiming  near the southeastern shore of Lake Waconia.

He kept a series of daily diaries and ledgers dating from 1850 until a few days until his death in 1898. Peterson's diary was donated by his family to the Minnesota Historical Society in 1939. These writings provided inspiration for Vilhelm Moberg's novels The Emigrants, Unto a Good Land, The Settlers, and The Last Letter Home, although they were set in Chisago County, Minnesota.

While Andrew Peterson is not familiar to many Americans, his story is well known in Sweden.  The Andrew Peterson Society was established in Sweden in 2003. In 2007 a tour group came from Sweden to visit the farm.  The Carver County Historical Society restored the granary on the farmstead in 2006 with help from Swedish carpenters, and began restoration on the north barn in 2010.  A musical called Andrew Peterson: The Genuine Pioneer Story had great success in Sweden in 2012.

Note
This article contains information obtained from the Swedish Wikipedia article Andrew Peterson.

References

Related reading
Mihelich, Josephine  (1984) Andrew Peterson and the Scandia story (Ford Johnson Graphics)

External links
The Andrew Peterson Farm
Andrew Peterson Society

Farms on the National Register of Historic Places in Minnesota
Houses in Carver County, Minnesota
National Register of Historic Places in Carver County, Minnesota
Swedish-American culture in Minnesota
1867 establishments in Minnesota
Greek Revival architecture in Minnesota